Arlington Experimental Farm was a former federal agricultural research farm in Alexandria, Virginia that opened in 1900. It was established by an Act of Congress, moving the Department of Agriculture's main research from the National Mall to Arlington. It grew hemp beginning in 1903 (under the cultivation of Lyster Dewey), or 1914. In 1928, it was the largest United States Department of Agriculture experiment station in the Washington, D.C. area. USDA researcher Vera Charles also worked at the station, collecting Cannabis seeds from across America and studying pests and pathogens that could diminish hemp crop productivity. Cultivars developed at Arlington include Arlington, Chington, Ferramington, Kymington and Arlington; Chington and Kymington were adopted "extensively" by seed farmers producing hemp in Kentucky. The seeds were probably destroyed by the government in the 1980s.

In the 1930s, research was transferred to Henry A. Wallace Beltsville Agricultural Research Center in Beltsville, Maryland. The land the farm had occupied became Arlington Farms temporary housing during World War II and was developed for the site of The Pentagon and its parking lots.

Footnotes

References

Sources

Further reading

1900 establishments in Virginia
Agricultural research institutes in the United States
Cannabis cultivation
Farms in Virginia
Hemp agriculture
Agricultural research stations
United States Department of Agriculture facilities